The December 2014 Rif Dimashq airstrikes were a series of aerial attacks made on targets in Syria on 7 December 2014. The targets were a military area in Al-Dimas and the Damascus International Airport area.

According to the Syrian Observatory for Human Rights, the attack near the Damascus International Airport targeted a depot for newly arrived weapons at a military facility that is part of the airport. The attack at Al-Dimas targeted weapons depots in hangars around a small air base. Ten explosions were heard at Al-Dimas and the Syrian Army stated that some installations were damaged. According to the Syrian Opposition, three Hezbollah members were killed by the strikes in Al-Dimas. Syria claimed that an unmanned aerial vehicle was shot down.

During the attack, Syrian air defenses fired four surface-to-air missiles, hitting at least one of the Israeli Popeye missiles, the remnants of which fell into rebel-held territory in Al-Harra.

Reactions
  - On 7 December, the Syrian Army condemned the attack and accused Israel of supporting "terrorists" in Syria.
  - In a response to the accusations, the Israeli military said it does not comment on "foreign reports."
  - Russia demanded explanation from Israel about the airstrikes. Russian foreign ministry spokesman Alexander Lukashevich also said that "Moscow is deeply worried by this dangerous development, the circumstances of which demand an explanation".

See also
 January 2013 Rif Dimashq airstrike
 May 2013 Rif Dimashq airstrikes
 April 2015 Qalamoun incident

References

2014 in the Syrian civil war
December 2014 events in Syria
Airstrikes during the Syrian civil war
Military operations of the Syrian civil war in 2014
Rif Dimashq Governorate in the Syrian civil war
Hezbollah involvement in the Syrian civil war
Hezbollah–Israel conflict
Iran–Israel conflict during the Syrian civil war
Israeli involvement in the Syrian civil war